9T or 9-T may refer to:

9T, IATA code for Transwest Air
Yak-9T, a model of  Yakovlev Yak-9
ZH-79-9T, a model of gun; see Makarych
R nineT, a model of motorcycle; see BMW R nineT

See also
T9 (disambiguation)